Coraliomargarita is a Gram-negative, obligately aerobic and non-motile bacterial genus from the family of Puniceicoccaceae.

References

Verrucomicrobiota
Bacteria genera
Taxa described in 2007